The College of Art and Built Environment came into existence in January 2005 in Kumasi, Ghana, as part of the restructuring of the Kwame Nkrumah University of Science and Technology into a Collegiate System. In the restructuring, the Faculty of Environmental and Development studies (FEDS) and the Institute of Land Management and Development (ILMAD) were merged to form the college.

Leadership 
 Provost - Prof. John Tiah Bugri
 College Registrar - Ms. Josephine K. Djampim
 College Finance Officer - Mrs. Catherine Acquah
 College Librarian - Mr. David V. K. Akorfu

Faculties & Departments

Faculty of Built Environment 
 Department of Architecture
 Department of Planning
 Department of Construction Technology Management
 Department of Land Economy

Faculty of Arts 
 Department of Industrial Art
 Department of Publishing Studies
 Department of Painting and Sculpture 
 Department of Communication Design

Faculty of Educational Studies 
 Department of Educational Innovations in Science and Technology
Department of Teacher education

Students 
 Architectural Students’ Association Ghana (ASAG)
 Construction Technology and Management Students’ Society (CTMSS)
 Ghana Association of Student Planners (GASP)
 Land Management and Development Students’ Association (LAMDSA)

Research

Institute of Human Settlements Research 
 Centre for Land Studies
 Centre for Settlements Studies

References 

Kwame Nkrumah University of Science and Technology